The Association of Information Technology Professionals (AITP) is a professional association that focuses on information technology education for business professionals. The group is a non-profit US-oriented group, but its activities are performed by 62 local chapters organized on a geographic basis, and 286 student chapters at college and universities.

History
The group was first organized in Chicago, United States, in 1949, as the National Machine Accountants Association (NMAA). The State of Illinois granted the NMAA a charter on December 26, 1951. It soon had over 20 chapters. Harvey W. Protzel, systems manager for Protzel's Company, was elected the first International President at the 1952 First Annual Convention in Minneapolis. In 1962, it adopted the more inclusive name, Data Processing Management Association (DPMA), and in 1996, the present name.

The Association began its certification program with the Certificate in Data Processing (CDP) professional examination, first  held in 1962 in New York City. In 1970, it added  the Registered Business Programmer (RBP) examination. In 1974, the Association joined in establishing the Institute for the Certification of Computer Professionals (ICCP) to administer the examination program and stimulate industry acceptance of the examinations. The certification is now called Certified Computing Professional (CCP)'.

In 1969, the Association created the annual DPMA Man of the Year Award, awarding it (incongruously, given its name) to Dr. Grace Murray Hopper. After Dr. Ruth Davis of the US National Bureau of Standards won the 1979 award, it was renamed the Distinguished Information Sciences Award.

In 2017, the Association was purchased by CompTIA.

In 2019, CompTIA rebranded the national AITP as CompTIA IT Pro and Student Membership, however many local chapters still retain the AITP name.

Ethics
The Association requires its members to abide by a code of ethics. The Association also requires members to operate by a "Standards of Conduct"'' for IT Professionals, which adds specifics.

See also
Association for Computing Machinery
IEEE Computer Society

References

External links
AITP official website
Oral history interview with Willis Daniel, Charles Babbage Institute, University of Minnesota. Daniel focuses on the origin and growth of the National Machine Accountants Association (NMAA), later the Data Processing Management Association (DPMA). He describes how the changes in business data processing in the 1940s and 1950s led to the creation of NMAA in an effort to pool knowledge and resources as well as increase the professionalism of the emerging position of data processing manager. 
Data Processing Management Association Records, Charles Babbage Institute, University of Minnesota.

Organizations established in 1949
1949 establishments in Illinois
Information technology organizations based in North America
Information technology education
Professional associations based in Chicago
Non-profit organizations based in Chicago
Data processing